The Nickelodeon Kids' Choice Awards Argentina, also known as the KCAAs and/or Kids Choice Awards Argentina, was an annual awards show that airs on Nickelodeon in Latin America. Its first edition was held on 11 October 2011 at the Microestadio Malvinas Argentinas. As in the original version, winners receive a hollow orange blimp figurine, a logo outline for much of the network's 1984-2009 era, which also functions as a kaleidoscope.

Hosts

Kids' Choice Awards Argentina 2011

Kids' Choice Awards Argentina 2012  

It was confirmed the second edition for the KCA Argentina, and occurred on 5 October 2012.

Kids' Choice Awards Argentina 2013  

Event occurred on 18 October 2013.

Kids' Choice Awards Argentina 2014

Kids' Choice Awards Argentina 2015

Kids' Choice Awards Argentina 2016

Kids' Choice Awards Argentina 2017 

The 7th Annual Nickelodeon Argentina Kids' Choice Awards was held on 19 October 2017, at Teatro Coliseo in Buenos Aires, and was telecast on 21 October 2017 through Nickelodeon. Mercedes Lambre and Leandro Leunis hosted the ceremony. Lali and Isabella Castillo led nominations with three each, and also were the biggest winners of the night, along with Camila Cabello and Mica Viciconte, with two awards each. Susana Giménez received the Career Achievement Award.

Kids' Choice Awards Argentina 2018  

It was held for the last time on 25 August 2018.

References

Spanish-language Nickelodeon original programming
Nickelodeon Kids' Choice Awards
Awards established in 2011
Awards disestablished in 2018